Joachim Walltin (born 25 June 1974) is a Norwegian football player.

Walltin is a midfielder. He played for Markaryd, Strindheim, Vålerenga and Brann before he joined Tromsø in 2005.

External links
Joachim Walltin profile at til.no

1974 births
Living people
Norwegian footballers
Strindheim IL players
Vålerenga Fotball players
SK Brann players
Tromsø IL players
Expatriate footballers in Sweden

Association football midfielders